This is a list of schools in the Roman Catholic Archdiocese of New Orleans.  They are not all operated by the archdiocese.  There are 5 universities or colleges and over 20 high schools within the archdiocese.

As per a 2013 strategic plan the New Orleans Archdiocese allows affiliated schools to either be grade PK-7 combined elementary and middle schools (similar to a K-8 school), grade 8-12 senior high schools, or full K-12 schools. As per the plan the standalone middle schools and combined middle and high schools were to reconfigure themselves. The new configurations were to be effective for the 2015-2016 school year. 37 schools were to be affected by the grade reconfiguration. The archdiocese planned to end affiliation with any school that did not comply with the grade configuration regime.

Universities and colleges
New Orleans (Orleans Parish)
 Loyola University New Orleans
 Notre Dame Seminary
 Our Lady of Holy Cross College
 Xavier University of Louisiana

 St. Tammany Parish
 Saint Joseph Seminary College (Covington)

K-12 schools
 Academy of the Sacred Heart - New Orleans - all-female
 Holy Cross School - New Orleans - all-male
 Saint Mary's Academy - New Orleans - Has separate PK -7 girls' school, grade 4-7 boys' school - and 8-12 girls' school
 St. Thérèse Academy for Exceptional Learners - Metairie - Established 2019, replacing Holy Rosary School and Our Lady of Divine Providence School; it occupies the former campus of the latter school.
 Ursuline Academy - New Orleans - all-female

High schools

New Orleans (Orleans Parish)

 Brother Martin High School  - all-male
 De La Salle High School - co-ed
 Jesuit High School - all-male

 Mount Carmel Academy  - all-female
 St. Augustine High School  - all-male
 St. Katharine Drexel Preparatory School  - all-female
 St. Mary's Dominican High School  - all-female

Jefferson Parish
Marrero
 The Academy of Our Lady - all-female
 Archbishop Shaw High School - all-male
Metairie
 Archbishop Chapelle High School  - all-female
 Archbishop Rummel High School - all-male

St. John the Baptist Parish
 St. Charles Catholic High School - Laplace - co-ed

St. Tammany Parish
Covington
 Archbishop Hannan High School - co-ed
 St. Paul's School  - all-male
 St. Scholastica Academy  - all-female
Slidell
 Pope John Paul II Catholic High School - co-ed

K-7 schools

New Orleans

 Christian Brothers School
 Includes two campuses: Canal Street Campus (former St. Anthony of Padua School) in Mid-City, and the City Park (original) campus.
 The school has a PK-4 coeducational elementary school in both locations, an all girls' 5-7 middle school in Canal Street, and an all boys' 5-7 middle school in City Park.
 It first opened in 1967. Previously Christian Brothers only had middle school and was all boys. In 2013 the archdiocese stated that it would no longer permit combined middle and high schools and standalone middle schools. In 2014 Christian Brothers and St. Anthony of Padua School announced they would merge effective fall 2016. In 2014 it had 360 students.
 Good Shepherd Nativity Mission
 Holy Name of Jesus School
 Resurrection of Our Lord School
 St. Alphonsus School
 St. Andrew the Apostle School
 St. Benedict the Moor School
 St. Dominic School
 St. Joan of Arc School

 St. Leo the Great
 St. Pius X School
 St. Rita School
 St. Stephen School - In Uptown New Orleans
 Stuart Hall School

Jefferson Parish

Gretna
 St. Anthony School - It was established in 1954.
 St. Cletus School

Harahan
 St. Rita School - It opened in 1953.

Harvey
 St. Rosalie School

Kenner
 Our Lady of Perpetual Help School - The school, the parish school of St. Mary’s Roman Catholic Church, opened in 1928. In 1951 an annex to the school opened. Another building with classrooms and a gymnasium was dedicated in 1956, and the current school building was dedicated in 1961. The Mercy Center, which houses school offices and a library, gymnasium, and a dedicated room for music classes, was dedicated in August 2004. Its enrollment from 2013-2014 to 2014-2015 increased by 8%.
 St. Elizabeth Ann Seton - It opened in August 1984.

Marrero
 Academy of Our Lady - Its enrollment from 2013-2014 to 2014-2015 increased by 3%.
 Immaculate Conception School
 Visitation of Our Lady School

Metairie
 St. Angela Merici School
 St. Ann School
 St. Benilde
 St. Catherine of Siena School
 St. Christopher School
 St. Clement of Rome School
 St. Edward the Confessor School
 St. Francis Xavier School
 St. Louis, King of France - On September 7, 1953, the school opened. Its initial enrollment was 40 students. Its peak enrollment was 1,500, though its initial enrollment was 40. The population decreased after new churches were established.
 St. Mary Magdalene School
 St. Philip Neri

River Ridge
 St. Matthew the Apostle School - The school opened in September 1960, with an educational building with 16 classrooms. In August 1962 another structure for classes opened, serving alongside the 1960 facility. In 1999 the current dining hall was built.

Terrytown
 Christ the King Parish School - Its enrollment from 2013-2014 to 2014-2015 decreased by 15%.

Westwego
 Our Lady of Prompt Succor School - Its enrollment from 2013-2014 to 2014-2015 increased by 22%; it is the only school in the parish with an enrollment increase of over 10%.

Plaquemines Parish
Belle Chasse
 Our Lady of Perpetual Help School - In 2018 it was establishing a program for students with moderate disabilities.

St. Bernard Parish
Chalmette
 Our Lady Of Prompt Succor School
 St. Mark School

St. Charles Parish
Destrehan
 St. Charles Borromeo School

St. John the Baptist Parish
Laplace
 Ascension of Our Lord School
 St. Joan of Arc School

Reserve
 St. Peter School

St. Tammany Parish
Covington
 St. Peter Catholic School

Mandeville
 Mary Queen of Peace School
 Our Lady of the Lake School

Slidell
 Our Lady of Lourdes School
 St. Margaret Mary School

Washington Parish
Bogalusa
 Annunciation School

Others
 New Orleans (Orleans Parish)
 St. Michael's Special School
 Jefferson Parish
 Hope Haven Special School (Marrero)

Former schools
In 1962 there were 153 Catholic schools. In 2000 the system had 52,500 students, in 106 schools. The number of schools was the same in 2003.

Hurricane Katrina in 2005 affected enrollment, with the system losing about 500 students annually, until the 2013, when there were 38,000 students, a 28% decline from the figure in 2000. The enrollment decline from 2003 to 2013 was 25%. The number of schools had declined to 84 in 2013. In the period 2003-2013 22 schools had closed.

In 2012 the archdiocese announced that it would consider closing grade schools with enrollments under 200 and identified 15 schools that it may close, although it did not, at the time, state which ones they were. In 2014 the archdiocese chose to close three schools effective 2015. 50 employees and 507 students were affected.  the archdiocese initiates a discussion on whether to close a Catholic grade school if the number of its students falls below 200.

Jefferson Parish
 Archbishop Blenk High School - merged in 2007 into The Academy of Our Lady
 Immaculata High School - merged in 2007 into The Academy of Our Lady
Our Lady of Divine Providence School (Metairie) - Grades PK-7 - Its enrollment from 2013-2014 to 2014-2015 decreased by 20%. Circa 2014 it had 211 students. In 2019 it had 167 students. It closed in 2019, replaced by St. Thérèse Academy for Exceptional Learners, which occupies the former Our Lady of Divine Providence.
St. Agnes School (Jefferson)  - It was created in 1941, and closed in 2015. From the 2013-2014 school year to the 2014-2015 school year enrollment declined by 27%, the most severe of any Catholic school in the parish. In 2014 it had 161 students, and then in 2015 it had 125 students. Principal Michael Buras stated that the school community gained an acceptance that the school will close. The school accepted school vouchers.  Jefferson Chamber Foundation Academy (JCFA) maintains a charter school for non-traditional students in the building.

New Orleans (Orleans Parish)
 Annunciation High School - The parish high school of Annunciation Church, it opened in 1932 and closed in 1971.
 Holy Rosary School - co-ed (K-12) - Closed in 2019
 Redeemer-Seton High School - closed in 2006
 Xavier University Preparatory School
 Annunciation Elementary School - Opened in 1894.
Cathedral Academy, originally St. Louis Cathedral School - In the French Quarter It opened in 1914, and had a building separate from that of its parish. In 2012 the archdiocese decided to close the school. It had 156 students in 2012, and the archdiocese's criterion for optimal enrollment in a K-7 was 200. St. Stephen offered places to St. Louis Cathedral students. Cathedral Academy parents stated opposition against the closure.
Holy Ghost School (Uptown) - It was a part of the Katharine Drexel Parish, and accepted school vouchers. It closed in 2015; it had 166 students that year.
 Immaculate Heart of Mary School
Our Lady of Lourdes School
Our Lady of the Rosary School - The building has a capacity of 500. It housed the Morris Jeff Community School, and after that one moved out in 2015, Bricolage Academy of New Orleans.
St. Francis of Assisi School - The building was later leased by the charter school Milestone SABIS Academy. In November 2011 St. Francis of Assisi Church agreed to lease its school building to another charter school, Lycée Français de la Nouvelle-Orléans. The Milestone SABIS school leadership learned of the change through the media.
St. Anthony of Padua School - merging with Christian Brothers in the 2016-2017 school year
St. Peter Claver School - It was in Tremé. It was established in 1921, and closed in 2019. In its final year it had 147 students, while the archdiocese's expected enrollment was 200. At the time its budget shortfall was $83,000. Its tuition usually ranged from $5,400 to $5,900 during the 2017-2018 school year.
 Immaculate Heart of Mary School
St. Matthias School - Opened in 1921 closed in 1979. The school building was affected by Hurricane Katrina.
St. Monica School - Master P attended this school. In 1999 it had 125 students. That year the archdiocese leadership stated that it was considering closing the school and merging it into Our Lady of Lourdes. Master P sent $250,000 to the school so it could remain in operation. Hurricane Katrina damaged the school and its affiliated church in 2005; by 2011 the archdiocese sold the property for the buildings to be razed.
 St. Paul the Apostle School
 St. Philip the Apostle School
 St. Raymond School
 St. Rose of Lima School - In 1962 the school desegregated, which resulted in anti-integration protests. In 1978 the congregation ended the school.
 St. Simon Peter School

 Plaquemines Parish
 Our Lady of Good Harbor School (Buras) - It was the first school that the archdiocese ordered desegregated circa the 1960s. As a result, area white families boycotted the school. In August 1963 a vandal bombed the school. Hurricane Camille in 1969 damaged the school.

 St. Bernard Parish
 St. Louise de Marillac School (Arabi)
 St. Robert Bellarmine School (Arabi)

 St. John the Baptist Parish
 Our Lady of Grace School (Reserve) - Closed in 2015; it had 171 students remaining, with about 51 having taken advantage of a Louisiana school voucher regime. There were two graduating classes in 2015.

 St. Landry Parish
 St. Charles College (Grand Coteau) - closed in 1922

References

External links
Roman Catholic Archdiocese of New Orleans

Schools

New Orleans
Schools
New Orleans